Robert Charles Burling (born October 15, 1984) is an American soccer player who plays as a  defender.

Career

College
Burling played college soccer at Loyola Marymount University and with Colorado Springs Blizzard in the USL Premier Development League before being drafted in the 4th round (45th overall) by Los Angeles Galaxy in the 2007 MLS Superdraft.

Professional
Burling was not offered a contract by Galaxy, and instead signed for Chivas USA three months later. He made over twenty appearances for Chivas, but did not score a goal. Burling was traded to San Jose Earthquakes on September 11, 2009 in exchange for a third-round pick in the 2010 MLS SuperDraft.

Burling was left exposed by San Jose in the 2011 MLS Expansion Draft and was selected by expansion side Montreal Impact. He never signed with Montreal and his rights were traded to Chivas USA for one season's use of an international roster slot on July 6, 2012. Burling officially signed with Chivas USA on August 17, 2012.

Following the 2014 season, the Chivas USA franchise was contracted by MLS and Burling was made available to other MLS clubs in the 2014 MLS Dispersal Draft. He was not selected. In December 2014, he was selected by Colorado Rapids in the MLS Waiver Draft. He was not retained for the 2018 season.

References

External links
 

1984 births
Living people
American soccer players
Association football defenders
Chivas USA players
Colorado Rapids players
Colorado Springs Blizzard players
LA Galaxy draft picks
Loyola Marymount Lions men's soccer players
People from Monument, Colorado
Major League Soccer players
San Jose Earthquakes players
Soccer players from Colorado
Soccer players from Texas
Sportspeople from Harris County, Texas
USL League Two players